Petalifera is a genus of sea slugs or sea hares, marine gastropod mollusks belonging to the family Aplysiidae, the sea hares.

Some authors place this genus in a separate family Dolabriferidae. A new study, published in September 2004, has shown that the genus Petalifera is paraphyletic.

(Note: Gastropod taxonomy has been in flux for more than half a century, and this is especially true currently, because of new research in molecular phylogeny. Because of all the ongoing changes, different reliable sources can yield very different classifications.)

A more general description can be found on the page of the superfamily Aplysioidea.

Description
The parapodia (fleshy winglike outgrowths), as can be seen in photos of Petalifera petalifera, are almost completely fused. The pair of small rounded flaps form the parapodial cavity over the mantle cavity and the vestigial shell. These sea hares swim by coiling and uncoiling the body.

Species
Petalifera albomaculata Farran, 1905 - Sri Lanka.
Petalifera habei Eales, 1960 (synonym of Petalifera ramosa)
Petalifera krusadalai O’Donoghue, 1930
Petalifera petalifera Rang, 1828
Distribution : Cosmopolitan.
Length : 2 to 4 cm
Color : grayish to brown, with white longitudinal bands; almost translucent.
Description : rather flat body; their color camouflages them when they are grazing on the brown alga Padina.
Petalifera punctulata Tapparone-Canefri, 1874
Distribution : Japan
Petalifera qingdaonensis Lin, 1990
Petalifera ramosa Baba, 1959
Distribution : Western Pacific, Atlantic.
Length : 5 to 7 cm
Color : pink to pale brownish, with white rings over the body; almost translucent.
Description : mantle covered with firm conical tubercles; the larger tubercles have terminal papillae with retractable filamentous branches; difficult to find, mostly hidden under the leaves of green alga Caulerpa.

Footnotes

External links and references 
 
 
 Photo of Petalifera petalifera
 Photo of Petalifera ramosa

Aplysiidae
Taxa named by John Edward Gray
Gastropod genera